Cola attiensis is a species of flowering plant in the Family Malvaceae.  It is endemic to Côte d'Ivoire. An extract from the plant exhibits visceral antileishmanial properties.

References

attiensis
Endemic flora of Ivory Coast
Endangered flora of Africa
Taxonomy articles created by Polbot
Taxa named by André Aubréville
Taxa named by François Pellegrin